Oneida Lake Congregational Church is a historic Congregational church located at Oneida Lake, Madison County, New York. The church was established in 1814, and the building was built in 1824. It is a post-and-beam structure sheathed in clapboard siding and measures approximately 38 feet by 48 feet, sitting on a stone foundation.  A 36-foot by 22-foot addition was built in 1922, with another 40-foot by 22-foot addition built in 1998. The front facade features a Greek Revival style enframement around the main entrance and pediment.  The low-pitched gable roof is topped by a two tiered tower.

It was added to the National Register of Historic Places in 2006.

References

United Church of Christ churches in New York (state)
Churches on the National Register of Historic Places in New York (state)
Federal architecture in New York (state)
Greek Revival church buildings in New York (state)
Churches completed in 1824
19th-century United Church of Christ church buildings
Churches in Madison County, New York
National Register of Historic Places in Madison County, New York